Shah Alam Community Forest (SACF) (also known as Setia Alam Community Trail) is a recreational site in Section U10, Shah Alam in Selangor, Malaysia. It is adjacent to the Shah Alam National Botanical Gardens. The main trail consists of a 6.9-km loop that is fairly challenging and can take around 3 hours to complete. The trail has an elevation gain of around 600 feet and is rated as "hard".

Flora and fauna 
The forest consists of both primary and secondary vegetation. Being part of the Bukit Cherakah Forest Reserve, the forest still has a population of Malayan tapir and White-handed gibbon. There are also many species of snakes, lizards, civet cats, monkeys resident in the area.

Activities and attractions

Downhill cycling 
SACF is become popular among cyclists for its steep drops. At least 5 loops of forest trails have been made by volunteer cycling groups, including members of the Shah Alam Community Forest Society (SACFS).

Hiking / trail running / jungle trekking 
Hikers and trail runners are daily visitors of SACF. The number of hikers increased during the Malaysia Movement Control Order (MCO) in 2021. The hill is the most accessible open-space getaway and workout opportunity for residents of the townships of Setia Alam and Alam Budiman. However, the trails can be slippery when wet and it is not advised to visit following a downpour.

History 

SACF is part of the traditional territory of the Temuan people, the local group of Orang Asli. These people still live in the southern part of the Bukit Cherakah Forest Reserve in the village of Kampung Air Kuning, Bukit Bandaraya, Shah Alam. In 1908, the area was constituted as part of the Bukit Cherakah Forest Reserve.

Development plans 

There are several proposals and ongoing developments in SACF. These include parts of the forest that are zoned for housing, a road, and a cemetery. Menteri Besar of Selangor, Amirudin Shari, said that part of the forest has been allocated to the state-agency Selangor State Development Corporation. NGOs SACFS and Pertubuhan Pelindung Khazanah Alam (PEKA) have challenged these plans.

References 

Nature sites of Selangor
Protected areas established in the 1900s